Picture Perfect is a 2016 Nigerian romantic drama film directed by Tope Alake. It was produced by Biodun Stephen, and had Mary Njoku, Bisola Aiyeola, Bolanle Ninalowo in lead roles.

Cast 
 Mary Njoku as Kunbi
 Bisola Aiyeola as Kiksy
 Bolanle Ninalowo as Jobe
 Ronke Ojo as
 Queen Salawa as

Reception 
Isabella Akinseye, for The Vanguard in her review applauded the minimal yet insightful delivery of the cast members, particularly Ninalowo role as "Jobe", who was noted to utilized the required energy to bring his character to live. Bisola Aiyeola was also listed as having transitioned into acting from her personality in Big Brother Naija perfectly. Ronke Ojo and Mary Njoku was also commended for having decent performances. The humor from the acting and story was also stated as a high point in the film, which ensured the entertainment value was on a high. However, the lack of sufficient and appropriate subtitles was identified as miss. Additionally, the editing and pacing was also indicated as not being professionally done.

It got a 64% rating on Nollywood Reinvented, who emphasized the versatility of Ninalowo in interpreting diverse roles in films. I summarized its review by expounding that the entertainment utility gotten from watching the film was what made it so special. In a review by talkafricanmovies, the film was "recommended", however the screenplay and aspects of the plots was questioned as being unrealistic in the real world. The acting of the main cast was praised as being talented and showcasing a different aspect of the actors.

Chidumga Izuzu for Pulse titled its review Tope Alake's "Picture Perfect" lives up to its title, while commending various facets of the film. Ife Olujuyigbe for True Nollywood Stories gave it a 60% rating while admitting the exemplary acting of Bolanle Ninalowo, the performance of Mary Njoku, was observed as not being ethnically appropriate, but modestly believable. The inclusion of Bisola Aiyeola as "Kiksy" was described as "nearly pointless", due to lack of individual character buildup about her life activities in the film. However, she was stated to have rescued the lapses with her impeccable acting. The character formulation of "Jobe" was elucidated as having a persona that demonstrates that even area boys/societal miscreants can still seek consent without making sexual advances and not take advantage of persons by having a high level of discipline. The pacing and some sub-plots were criticized as not being well done.

Accolades 
The drama got five nominations at the 2017 Best of Nollywood Awards, including the category for the best actor in a lead role, best supporting actress, best use of Nigerian food in a film, best costume and best makeup.

References 

2016 films
Nigerian romantic drama films